Charline Schwarz (born 15 January 2001) is a German archer. She competed in the women's individual event at the 2020 Summer Olympics in Tokyo, Japan, and she won the bronze medal in the women's team event.

In 2021, she won the silver medal in the women's team recurve event at the European Archery Championships held in Antalya, Turkey.

She won the gold medal in the women's team recurve event at the 2022 European Archery Championships held in Munich, Germany.

References

External links
 

2001 births
Living people
German female archers
Olympic archers of Germany
Archers at the 2020 Summer Olympics
Olympic medalists in archery
Olympic bronze medalists for Germany
Medalists at the 2020 Summer Olympics
Place of birth missing (living people)
21st-century German women